The 17th parallel north is a circle of latitude that is 17 degrees north of the Earth's equatorial plane. It crosses Africa, Asia, the Indian Ocean, the Pacific Ocean, Central America, the Caribbean and the Atlantic Ocean.

The parallel is particularly significant in the history of Vietnam (see below).

At this latitude the sun is visible for 13 hours, 9 minutes during the summer solstice and 11 hours, 7 minutes during the winter solstice.

Around the world
Starting at the Prime Meridian and heading eastwards, the parallel 17° north passes through:

{| class="wikitable plainrowheaders"
! scope="col" width="125" | Co-ordinates
! scope="col" | Country, territory or ocean
! scope="col" | Notes
|-
| 
! scope="row" | 
|
|-
| 
! scope="row" | 
|
|-
| 
! scope="row" | 
|
|-
| 
! scope="row" | 
|
|-
| 
! scope="row" | 
|
|- 
| style="background:#b0e0e6;" | 
! scope="row" style="background:#b0e0e6;" | Indian Ocean
| style="background:#b0e0e6;" | Red Sea
|-
| 
! scope="row" | 
| Farasan Islands
|- 
| style="background:#b0e0e6;" | 
! scope="row" style="background:#b0e0e6;" | Indian Ocean
| style="background:#b0e0e6;" | Red Sea
|-
| 
! scope="row" | 
|
|-
| 
! scope="row" | 
|
|-
| 
! scope="row" | 
|
|-
| 
! scope="row" | 
|
|-
| 
! scope="row" | 
|
|-
| style="background:#b0e0e6;" | 
! scope="row" style="background:#b0e0e6;" | Indian Ocean
| style="background:#b0e0e6;" | Arabian Sea
|-
| 
! scope="row" | 
|
|-
| style="background:#b0e0e6;" | 
! scope="row" style="background:#b0e0e6;" | Indian Ocean
| style="background:#b0e0e6;" | Arabian Sea
|-valign="top"
| 
! scope="row" | 
| Maharashtra Karnataka Andhra Pradesh Telangana
|-
| style="background:#b0e0e6;" | 
! scope="row" style="background:#b0e0e6;" | Indian Ocean
| style="background:#b0e0e6;" | Bay of Bengal
|-
| 
! scope="row" |  (Burma)
| Passing through Hlawga National Park north of Yangon
|-
| style="background:#b0e0e6;" | 
! scope="row" style="background:#b0e0e6;" | Indian Ocean
| style="background:#b0e0e6;" | Gulf of Martaban
|-
| 
! scope="row" |  (Burma)
| 
|-
| 
! scope="row" | 
|
|-
| 
! scope="row" | 
|
|-
| 
! scope="row" | 
|
|-
| style="background:#b0e0e6;" | 
! scope="row" style="background:#b0e0e6;" | Pacific Ocean
| style="background:#b0e0e6;" | South China Sea, passing through the disputed Paracel Islands
|-
| 
! scope="row" | 
| Island of Luzon
|-valign="top"
| style="background:#b0e0e6;" | 
! scope="row" style="background:#b0e0e6;" | Pacific Ocean
| style="background:#b0e0e6;" | Philippine Sea Passing between the islands of Guguan and Sarigan,  into an unnamed part of the Ocean
|-
| 
! scope="row" | 
|
|-
| 
! scope="row" | 
|
|-
| 
! scope="row" | 
|
|-valign="top"
| style="background:#b0e0e6;" | 
! scope="row" style="background:#b0e0e6;" | Atlantic Ocean
| style="background:#b0e0e6;" | Caribbean Sea, passing just south of the island of Nevis,  Passing just north of the island of Redonda, 
|-
| 
! scope="row" | 
| Island of Antigua
|-
| style="background:#b0e0e6;" | 
! scope="row" style="background:#b0e0e6;" | Atlantic Ocean
| style="background:#b0e0e6;" | 
|-
| 
! scope="row" | 
| Santo Antão island
|-
| style="background:#b0e0e6;" | 
! scope="row" style="background:#b0e0e6;" | Atlantic Ocean
| style="background:#b0e0e6;" | 
|-
| 
! scope="row" | 
|
|-
| 
! scope="row" | 
|
|}

Vietnam 

The Seventeenth parallel was the provisional military demarcation line between North and South Vietnam established by the Geneva Accords of 1954. The demarcation line did not exactly coincide with the 17th parallel but ran south of it, approximately along the Bến Hải River in Quảng Trị Province to the village of Bo Ho Su and from there due west to the Laos–Vietnam border.

In 1976 the demarcation line was made irrelevant as Vietnam was unified following the withdrawal of American forces and the surrender of the South Vietnamese government.

See also
16th parallel north
18th parallel north

References

n17